"All your base are belong to us" is an Internet meme based on a badly translated phrase from the opening cutscene of the Japanese video game Zero Wing. The phrase first appeared on the European release of the 1991 Sega Mega Drive port of the 1989 Japanese arcade game.

By the early 2000s, a GIF animation depicting the opening text was widespread on internet forums. A music video accompanied by an EDM remix of the clip was posted on comedy forum Something Awful, gaining popularity and being referenced outside of the forums, becoming an Internet meme. The meme has been referenced many times in media outside of the forums.

Zero Wing transcript

Below are some other examples of text as it appeared in the poorly translated English release, alongside a more accurate translation from the original Japanese.

History

Zero Wing was released in Japanese arcades by developer Toaplan on 1 July 1989, and in North America in April 1990. The European release of the game on the Sega Mega Drive was in July 1991.

The first references could be seen in 1999 and the early 2000s when an animated GIF of the scene appeared on forums and sites like Zany Video Game Quotes, OverClocked, and TribalWar forums. In November 2000, Kansas City computer programmer, Something Awful forum member, and part-time disc jockey Jeffrey Ray Roberts (1977–2011) of the gabber band The Laziest Men on Mars, made a techno dance track, "Invasion of the Gabber Robots", which remixed some of the Zero Wing video game music by Tatsuya Uemura and Noriyuki Iwadare with a voice-over phrase "All your base are belong to us". On 16 February 2001, user Bad_CRC posted an animated music video accompanying the song onto the Flash game and animation sharing site Newgrounds. The video was shared rapidly, soon becoming an Internet meme and receiving widespread media attention. The meme's popularity was seen throughout the early 2000s when it was broadcast onto the ticker of a Raleigh TV channel, used as a placeholder message while YouTube was undergoing maintenance, and reproduced onto T-shirts.

The meme was addressed by Toaplan's Tatsuya Uemura (the game's programmer and composer) and Masahiro Yuge (composer) in interviews during the 2010s. He stated the poor English translation in the Mega Drive version was handled by a member of Toaplan in charge of export and overseas business.

The 15th and 20th anniversaries of the posting of the remix on Newgrounds were recognized by numerous culture sites. The meme has been highlighted for its uniqueness in that, unlike other memes of the time, it lacked sexual innuendos or vulgarity.

Mentions in media

The phrase or some variation of lines from the game has appeared numerous times in films, commercials, news broadcasts, and social media posts.

On 1 April 2003, in Sturgis, Michigan, seven people placed signs through the town that read: "All your base are belong to us. You have no chance to survive make your time." They claimed to be playing an April Fools' joke, but most people who saw the signs were unfamiliar with the phrase. Many residents were upset that the signs appeared while the U.S. was at war with Iraq, and police chief Eugene Alli said the signs could be "a borderline terrorist threat, depending on what someone interprets it to mean".

In February 2004, North Carolina State University students and members of TheWolfWeb in Raleigh, North Carolina exploited a web-based service used by local schools and businesses to report weather-related closures to display the phrase within a news ticker on a live news broadcast on News 14 Carolina.

On 1 June 2006, the phrase "ALL YOUR VIDEO ARE BELONG TO US" appeared below the YouTube logo as a placeholder while YouTube was under maintenance. Some users believed the site had been hacked, leading YouTube to add the message "No, we haven't be hacked. Get a sense of humor."

On 19 January 2019, American Congresswoman Alexandria Ocasio-Cortez (D-NY) tweeted "All your base (are) belong to us" in response to a poll by Hill-HarrisX indicating that 45% of the Republicans who were polled approved of Ocasio-Cortez's suggested implementation of a 70% marginal tax rate for individuals making more than $10 million per year.

See also

 English As She Is Spoke
 List of Internet phenomena
 Lolspeak
 The cake is a lie

Footnotes

References

External links

 
 
 All your base are belong to us at the Internet Archive

 

1991 in video gaming
In-jokes
Internet memes introduced in the 2000s
Quotations from video games
Video game memes
1991 neologisms